Feliciano López and Marc López were the defending champions, but Marc chose not to participate this year and Feliciano chose to compete at the Hopman Cup instead.
Jérémy Chardy and Fabrice Martin won the title, defeating Vasek Pospisil and Radek Štěpánek in the final, 6–4, 7–6(7–3).

Seeds

Draw

References
 Main Draw

Doubles